Ryohei Miyazaki (born 20 September 1995) is a Japanese footballer who last played as a winger for Bačka.

Career

Before the second half of 2014/15, Miyazaki signed for Polish side Sparta Brodnica after playing for Tsukuba FC in the Japanese sixth division.

Before the 2016 season, he signed for Japanese eighth division club Iwaki FC.

Before the 2017 season, he signed for Shiga City FC in the Japanese sixth division.

In 2017, Miyazaki signed for Japanese fifth division team Lagend Shiga FC.

Before the 2018 season, he signed for San Diego Zest in the United States.

Before the 2020 season, he signed for Malaysian third division outfit Melawati FC.

Before he second half of 2020/21, Miyazaki signed for Bačka in the Serbian top flight. On 14 May 2021, he debuted for Bačka during a 0-5 loss to Crvena zvezda.

References

External links

 Ryohei Miyazaki at playmakerstats.com
 

Association football forwards
Association football wingers
Japanese footballers
Living people
1995 births
Japanese expatriate sportspeople in Malaysia
Japanese expatriate sportspeople in the United States
Japanese expatriate sportspeople in Serbia
Serbian SuperLiga players
Expatriate footballers in Malaysia
Expatriate footballers in Poland
OFK Bačka players
San Diego Zest players
Sparta Brodnica players
Expatriate footballers in Serbia
Expatriate soccer players in the United States
USL League Two players
III liga players
Association football people from Shizuoka Prefecture
Japanese expatriate sportspeople in Poland
Japanese expatriate footballers